Subulina usambarica is a species of small, tropical, air-breathing land snail, a terrestrial pulmonate gastropod mollusk in the family Achatinidae.

Distribution
The species is endemic to Tanzania.

References

Endemic fauna of Tanzania
Subulininae
Taxonomy articles created by Polbot